Leon Kessel (1911–2001) was a South African international lawn bowler and team manager.

He competed in the first World Bowls Championship in Kyeemagh, New South Wales, Australia in 1966  and won a bronze medal in the triples with Kelvin Lightfoot and Tommy Harvey at the event.

He was the team manager of the all-conquering South African team during the 1976 World Outdoor Bowls Championship.

References

1911 births
2001 deaths
South African male bowls players